The Salt Lake City Union Pacific Depot is a building on the western edge of downtown Salt Lake City, Utah, United States. Built in 1908–09, it dates back to the more prosperous era in the history of American railroad travel.  As Salt Lake Union Pacific Railroad Station, it is listed on the National Register of Historic Places.

Railway history
Originally called the Union Station, it was jointly constructed by the San Pedro, Los Angeles and Salt Lake Railroad and the Oregon Short Line, both later wholly owned by the Union Pacific, at an estimated cost of $450,000 ($ in today's dollars). The platforms behind the station ran north-to-south, parallel to the first main line built in the Salt Lake Valley, which predated the station building. South of 1300 South this is the route used by the UTA TRAX Blue Line and Salt Lake City Southern, while north of North Temple (100 North) it is used by the FrontRunner line and Union Pacific. Trains from the west used a line south of 900 South in Glendale to approach the north-to-south platforms. The Salt Lake and Ogden (Bamberger) Interurban line also stopped nearby. When Amtrak was formed in 1971, it took over the remaining passenger services at the station, but after Rio Grande joined Amtrak all trains were moved to its station three blocks south.

Amtrak
From 1977 to 1986 the depot served as Salt Lake City's Amtrak station, but was then replaced by the Denver and Rio Grande Western Depot. It was served by the California Zephyr, Desert Wind, and Pioneer trains, with the latter two having been discontinued in 1997. The California Zephyr runs once daily between Chicago, Illinois and Emeryville, California (in the San Francisco Bay Area). The former Desert Wind ran daily from Chicago to Los Angeles) and the former Pioneer ran daily Chicago to Seattle. In 1999 Amtrak moved to the Salt Lake City Intermodal Hub.

Architecture
According to The Railway Gazette (1907) the structure's plans came from the office of J.H. Wallace, Assistant Chief Engineer of the Southern Pacific, under the direction of D.J. Patterson, Architect for that company. It served the San Pedro, Los Angeles and Salt Lake and the Oregon Short Line when it was completed in 1909 and became wholly owned by Union Pacific in the 1920s. Initially, both railroads' initials were prominently displayed on the front of the building, but the "Union Pacific" shield or related logo has graced the depot for most of its history.

The sandstone building is in French Second Empire style, and includes a terrazzo floor and stained glass windows. One ceiling mural “Driving The Golden Spike” by San Francisco artist John MacQuarrie in 1909, depicts the driving of the Golden Spike north of Salt Lake City at "Promontory Summit" signifying the completion of the first transcontinental railroad in 1869. Another mural, “Emigrants Entering Salt Lake Valley,” by San Francisco artists John MacQuarrie & August C. Wocker in 1909, shows the 1847 arrival of Mormon pioneers to what is now Salt Lake City.

Several side rooms were originally used for separate male and female waiting areas. The depot once housed an emergency hospital, lunch room, baggage rooms, and offices for both of the original railroads. Most of these features are gone now, but the building was extensively renovated in the 1970s to repair damage. Additionally, the original slate roof was replaced by copper plates due to leaking problems.

Current
The main lobby, no longer used by Amtrak (which has relocated the Salt Lake City Intermodal Hub), serves as an entrance to The Gateway development. Most of the building is not used for its original purpose, but Union Pacific uses some of the space for offices and training areas.

In January 2006, three floors opened as a restaurant and music venue, fittingly called The Depot. The Depot brings a wide variety of musical talent to Salt Lake City.

References

External links

 The Depot: now a hip Salt Lake City concert venue
 Salt Lake City Amtrak Station, with former Rio Grande & Union Pacific Stations (USA RailGuide -- TrainWeb)
 

Former railway stations in Salt Lake City
Railway stations on the National Register of Historic Places in Utah
Union stations in the United States
Union Pacific Railroad stations in Utah
Buildings and structures in Salt Lake City
Former Amtrak stations in Utah
Railway stations in the United States opened in 1909
Historic American Buildings Survey in Utah
1909 establishments in Utah
Railway stations closed in 1986
National Register of Historic Places in Salt Lake City
Los Angeles and Salt Lake Railroad
Oregon Short Line Railroad